Grain crimping or moist grain crimping is an agricultural technology, an organic way to preserve feed grain into livestock fodder by fermentation.

Crimped grain brings health benefits to the animals and economic benefits such as cost savings and increased meat or milk production to the farmer.

History 
Crimping was developed in Finland in the late 1960s by two farmer brothers, Aimo and Gunnar Korte, based on findings of British researchers as early as 1918. The brothers made the first crimper machine for home farm use. As knowledge of the device became widespread, they established a company to manufacture and sell the machines.

British researchers had established that grain attains its peak nutritional value when the moisture content is between 35% and 45%. It took about 50 years before this knowledge was successfully utilized to process and preserve grain when moist.

Description 
Traditionally grain is only harvested when it is dry enough to be ground by a hammer mill. Moist grain cannot be ground or stored without machine drying and using preservatives, which increases cost.

In crimping, the grain is combined moist and run through the crimper machine, which will break and flatten the grains. Additives, such as preservatives or molasses and water (if necessary) can be added to ensure the protection of nutrients.

Crimped grain is stored in storage silos as a silage.

Crimped grain is dustless, thus convenient to handle, does not require further processing, and is often preferred by animals over drier and dustier feeds.

Practical experiments by farming and livestock research institutions in Finland, Sweden, UK and elsewhere have confirmed that crimped feed has higher nutritional value, it increases the animals' growth and milk production, improves milk quality and the animals' health and helps cut costs.

An important point is that crimping home-grown grain and processing the feed on the spot at the farm, enables feed ingredients to be controlled and fully traceable. This helps in prevention of diseases, such as BSE.

See also 
 Animal husbandry
 Dairy farming
 Harvest

References 
Pohjanheimo & Ettala (1971). "Tuoreena säilötty ohra lypsylehmien rehuna" (in Finnish; 'Freshly ensilaged barley as feed for dairy cows'), MTT Agrifood Research Finland, Animal Production Research, Koetoiminta ja Käytäntö Bulletin No.5: p. 17-20.
Rissanen & Ettala (1977). "Säilöviljan käyttö rehuna" (in Finnish;'Using silage stored grain as livestock feed'), MTT Agrifood Research Finland, Animal Production Research, Koetoiminta ja Käytäntö Bulletin 29 Nov 1977: p. 41-44.
Virtanen (1982). "Viljan murskesäilöntä" (in Finnish;'Crimping feed grains'), MTT Agrifood Research Finland, Animal Production Research, Koetoiminta ja Käytäntö Bulletin 24 Aug 1982, p. 42.
Siljander et al. (2000). "Effective on-farm use of grain" (English abstract, article in Finnish), Article in MTT Agrifood Research Finland, Animal Production Research publication, series A, No. 79, 2002. Salo R (editor), p. 68-75.
Jaakkola et al. (2001). "Murskeviljan käyttö lypsylehmien ruokinnassa" (in Finnish;'Using crimped grain in feeding dairy cows'), MTT Agrifood Research Finland, Animal Production Research.
Palva, R (2002). "Rehuviljan murskesäilöntä – työmenekki ja kustannukset" (in Finnish;'Crimping and ensiling feed grain - labour and costs'), TTS Work Efficiency Institute, Bulletin No 543/2002.
Jaakkola (editor) (2003). "Murskesäilönnän vaikutus rehuviljan satoon, tappioihin ja tuotantovaikutukseen lypsylehmien ruokinnassa" (in Finnish;'The effect of crimping on the grain yield, on losses and on production input in feeding dairy cows'), MTT Agrifood Research Finland, Animal Production Research, 41 p.
Venäläinen et al. (2005). "Broilereillekin maistuu murskesäilötty ohra" (in Finnish;'Feeding chickens with crimped grain'), MTT Agrifood Research Finland, Animal Production Research, Koetoiminta ja Käytäntö Bulletin No.3(17 Oct 2005), p. 15.
Jaakkola (2005). "Herneen murskesäilöntä ja käyttö märehtijöiden ruokinnassa: tutkimusyhteistyöhanke v. 2002-2004" (in Finnish;'Crimping peas for feeding bovines: a joint research project 2002/2004'), MTT Agrifood Research Finland, Animal Production Research; Kemira Plc, Aimo Kortteen Konepaja Oy, 29 p.
Jaakkola (2005). "Tuoresäilötyn viljan ruokinnallinen arvo naudoilla" (in Finnish;'The nutritional value of freshly crimped grain on bovines'), Article in ProAgria Association of Rural Advisory Centres' publication 2005, Series: Tieto tuottamaan, no. 108, p. 59-61. 
Jaakkola et al. (2005). "Ensiled high moisture barley or dry barley in the grass silage-based diet of dairy cows" Edited by: R.S. Park, M.D. Stronge. Silage production and utilisation : proceedings of the XIVth international silage conference, a satellite workshop of the XXth international grassland congress, July 2005, Belfast, Northern Ireland. Wageningen Academic Publishers. p. 184.
Jaakkola et al. (2006). "Murskesäilötyn herne-kauraseoksen säilöntälaatu" (in Finnish;'Silage quality of crimped mixture of peas and oats'),  The Scientific Agricultural Society of Finland, Bulletin No.21, p. 7.
Siljander-Rasi (2007). "Rehuarvo sama kuin kuivatun viljan: tuoresäilöttyä viljaa sioille" (in Finnish;'Feed value equal to dried grain: crimped grain for pigs'), Sika Bulletin No.37, 3: 38-39.

External links 
 Aimo Kortteen Konepaja Oy the pioneering company that introduced the method and has been developing the necessary machines
 A UK company's guide to crimping at Kelvincave.com

Dairy farming technology
Grain production